Valerji Karetnikov (born 1963) is a Soviet former ski jumper.

References

1963 births
Living people
Russian male ski jumpers
Date of birth missing (living people)